Andrea Beaty is an American children's author.

Life and career
She was born in Benton, Illinois and currently resides in Naperville, Illinois. As a child, she loved Nancy Drew mysteries. She attended Southern Illinois University and studied Biology and Computer Science. After graduating, she worked for a software company, doing some technical writing. Her tech writing experience led her to write children's books. She received the Prairie State for Excellence in Children's Writing Award from the Illinois Reading Council in 2014.

Selected works

 Iggy Peck, Architect (2007)
 Doctor Ted (2008)
 Firefighter Ted (2009)
 Artist Ted (2012)
 Dorko the Magnificent (2013)
 Rosie Revere, Engineer (2013), New York Times Best Seller in "Children's Picture Books"
 Ada Twist, Scientist (2016)
 Ada Twist and the Perilous Pantaloons (2019)
 Sofia Valdez, Future Prez (2019), New York Times Best Seller in "Children's Picture Books"
 Aaron Slater, Illustrator (2021)

References

Living people
American children's writers
American women children's writers
People from Benton, Illinois
People from Naperville, Illinois
Southern Illinois University alumni
21st-century American writers
Year of birth missing (living people)
21st-century American women